Harelbeke railway station is in the city of Harelbeke in the Belgian province of West Flanders. It is on Line 75 between Ghent and Kortrijk and across the French border to Lille.

Train services
The station is served by the following services:

Intercity services (IC-12) Kortrijk - Ghent - Brussels - Leuven - Liege - Welkenraedt (weekdays)
Intercity services (IC-12) Kortrijk - Ghent (weekends)

Railway stations in Belgium
Railway stations in West Flanders
Harelbeke
Railway stations in Belgium opened in 1839